This is a detailed list of human spaceflights from 2001 to 2010, including the first full era of the International Space Station, first Shenzhou flights and first commercial space flights.

Red indicates fatalities.
Green indicates a suborbital flight.

See also

List of human spaceflight programs
List of human spaceflights
List of human spaceflights, 1961–1970
List of human spaceflights, 1971–1980
List of human spaceflights, 1981–1990
List of human spaceflights, 1991–2000
List of human spaceflights, 2011–2020
List of human spaceflights, 2021–present

References
Vostok and Voskhod flight history
Mercury flight history
X-15 flight history (altitudes given in feet)
Gemini flight history
Apollo flight history (student resource)
Skylab flight history
Apollo-Soyuz flight history
Space Shuttle flight history infographic
Shenzhou flight history timeline
SpaceShipOne flight history

2001-2010
2000
Spaceflight timelines
2000s-related lists